Labi Kousoulis (born 1971) is a Canadian politician, who was elected to the Nova Scotia House of Assembly in the 2013 provincial election. A member of the Nova Scotia Liberal Party, he represented the electoral district of Halifax Citadel-Sable Island until his defeat in the 2021 Nova Scotia general election.

Early life and education
Kousoulis was born and raised in Halifax, Nova Scotia, the son of John Kousoulis and Marina Michalakos, who emigrated from Laconia in Southern Greece though Pier 21. He graduated from Saint Mary's University in 1996 with a Bachelor of Commerce in Finance and is a Chartered Professional Accountant. He holds a Master in Business Administration from Saint Mary's University Sobey School of Business.

Before politics
He worked as a commercial lender with Scotiabank, was an executive member of Wilsons Fuel, and as controller at Trenton Works. Kousoulis has also started a number of small businesses.

Political career
On October 22, 2013, Kousoulis was appointed to the Executive Council of Nova Scotia where he served as Minister of the Public Service Commission, as well as being appointed Minister of Information Management and Minister of the Voluntary Sector. On April 1, 2014, he was appointed Minister of Internal Services, a new department including the responsibilities of the former Information Management portfolio, as well as various other support functions within government.

Kousoulis was re-elected in the 2017 election. On June 15, 2017, premier Stephen McNeil shuffled his cabinet, moving Kousoulis to Minister of Labour and Advanced Education. Kousoulis has been a member of the Treasury and Policy Board since his appointment to the Executive Council of Nova Scotia in 2013.

On February 23, 2021, Kousoulis was appointed as the Minister of Finance and Treasury Board, Minister of Inclusive Economic Growth (Formerly Business) and Minister of Trade.

Leadership campaign 
On September 30, 2020, Kousoulis announced his candidacy for the Leader of the Liberal Party of Nova Scotia and to become the 29th Premier of the Province.

Electoral record

|-
 
|Liberal
|Labi Kousoulis
|align="right"|2,966
|align="right"|47.66
|align="right"| 
|-
 
|New Democratic Party
|Leonard Preyra
|align="right"|1,934
|align="right"|31.08
|align="right"| 
|-
 
|Progressive Conservative
|Andrew Black
|align="right"|1,094
|align="right"|17.58 
|align="right"| 
|-

|-
 
|Independent (Atlantica)
|Frederic Boileau-Cadieux
|align="right"|31
|align="right"|0.50
|align="right"| 
|}

References

Living people
Canadian people of Greek descent
Nova Scotia Liberal Party MLAs
People from Halifax, Nova Scotia
Members of the Executive Council of Nova Scotia
21st-century Canadian politicians
1971 births